Eagle Township may refer to the following places in the United States:

 Eagle Township, LaSalle County, Illinois
 Eagle Township, Boone County, Indiana
 Eagle Township, Black Hawk County, Iowa
 Eagle Township, Kossuth County, Iowa
 Eagle Township, Sioux County, Iowa
 Eagle Township, Barber County, Kansas
 Eagle Township, Kingman County, Kansas
 Eagle Township, Clinton County, Michigan
 Eagle Township, Carlton County, Minnesota
 Eagle Township, Brown County, Ohio
 Eagle Township, Hancock County, Ohio
 Eagle Township, Vinton County, Ohio

Township name disambiguation pages